Oost-Barendrecht is a former municipality in the Dutch province of South Holland. It covered the eastern part of the current municipality of Barendrecht.

The municipality existed between 1817 and 1837, when it merged with West-Barendrecht to form the new municipality "Oost- en West-Barendrecht", now just called "Barendrecht".

References

Former municipalities of South Holland
Barendrecht